Albertville Aerodrome , is an airport in Tournon, a commune in Savoie, France.

References 

External links 
Albertville flying club

Airports in Auvergne-Rhône-Alpes
Buildings and structures in Savoie
Albertville